Putnam County High School is a public high school located at 402 East Silverspoon, Granville, Illinois.  Its mascot is the Panthers, and its teams play in the Tri-County Conference.
The superintendent is Clayton Theisinger and the principal is Dustin Schrank.

References

Public high schools in Illinois
Schools in Putnam County, Illinois